In music, Op. 79 stands for Opus number 79. Compositions that are assigned this number include:

 Beethoven – Piano Sonata No. 25
 Brahms – Rhapsodies, Op. 79
 Britten – The Building of the House
 Elgar – Le drapeau belge
 Fauré – Fantaisie
 Milhaud – Little Symphony No. 6
 Saint-Saëns – Caprice sur des airs danois et russes
 Schumann – Liederalbum für die Jugend
 Shostakovich – From Jewish Folk Poetry
 Strauss – Arabella
 Weber – Konzertstück in F minor